Bağıştaş can refer to:

 Bağıştaş, İliç
 Bağıştaş 1 Dam
 Bağıştaş 2 Dam